The Universal Wrestling Association (UWA) was a Mexican Lucha Libre or  professional wrestling promotion based in Naucalpan, Mexico State that operated from 1975 until 1995. The name of the actual promotion was Lucha Libre Internacional (LLI) ("International wrestling") but outside of Mexico it is generally referred to as the UWA as it was the name of the fictional international sanctioning body that in storyline terms oversaw all championships promoted by the UWA. The company was founded by wrestler and trainer Ray Mendoza, promoter Francisco Flores and investor Benjamín Mora, Jr. as when they broke away from Empresa Mexicana de Lucha Libre to form their own promotion. The company had working agreements with wrestling promotions both in the United States and Japan as they worked with New Japan Pro-Wrestling, the World Wrestling Federation and Japan Women's Pro-Wrestling (JWP).

History
In 1974 Empresa Mexicana de Lucha Libre (CMLL) founder and owner Salvador Lutteroth González brought his son into the promotion, grooming him to take over when the aging Lutteroth, Sr. eventually had to retire. This action combined with a very rigid and conservative promotional philosophy led EMLL's Promoter in Naucalpan, Mexico State, Francisco Flores, EMLL wrestler and trainer Ray Mendoza and investor Benjamin Mora, Jr. to break away from EMLL to form their own company and challenge EMLL's dominance in Mexico. With the impending change of management in EMLL many wrestlers who had previously been loyal to Lutteroth decided to leave with Flores, Mendoza and Mora including Mendoza's close friends Rene Guajardo and Karloff Lagarde and a number of young wrestles, frustrated with the lack of opportunities in EMLL. They formed the company Lucha Libre Internacional, which would later be known as the Universal Wrestling Association and held their first show on January 29, 1975 creating the first true rival for EMLL in decades.

To some the promotion was simply "Lucha Libre from El Toreo de Naucalpan", after the promotion's home base and a building Flores had promoted wrestling in for years before the split. El Toreo (a former bullring turned into an arena in 1968, now demolished and formerly located near Metro Cuatro Caminos station) became UWA's main venue, used for major title matches, their anniversary shows and significant Lucha de Apuesta (bet matches) events.

UWA's more relaxed approach to wrestling, combined with their willingness to promote younger wrestlers made the promotion a quick success as they drew repeated sell-out crowds at El Toreo. The promotion was the first to elevate wrestlers such as El Canek, Dos Caras, Fishman, Perro Aguayo and Villano III to main event status. El Canek became the "face of the UWA", holding the UWA World Heavyweight Championship no less than 13 times during the promotion's life span, drawing full houses when he "defended Mexico's honor" against foreign wrestlers such as Hulk Hogan, Tatsumi Fujinami or Big Van Vader.

The UWA also reached out to promotions around the globe and forged working relationships with the World Wrestling Federation (WWF) in the United States and New Japan Pro-Wrestling (NJPW) and Japan Women's Pro-Wrestling (JWP) in Japan. This working relationship resulted in a larger influx of foreign wrestlers than EMLL was ever able to produce and also led to the UWA actually gaining exclusive rights to promote a WWF branded championship, the WWF World Light Heavyweight Championship in the early 1980s, even if the promotion does not acknowledge the lineage in their official title history today.

The UWA even began working with EMLL in the 1980s, co-promoting shows and allowing EMLL to book UWA wrestlers on their shows. By the early 1990s UWA began to struggle financially as several of their top wrestlers left the company to work for EMLL who could offer them more money.

In 1992 Antonio Peña broke away from EMLL, much like the UWA had 18 years earlier, and formed a new company called Asistencia Asesoría y Administración (AAA) further affecting the UWA's finances. As the peso devaluated sharply in the mid-1990s, the UWA was forced to close its doors in 1995.

Legacy
The UWA is remembered as the place where a lot of main event wrestlers of the 1980s and 1990s got their start, including El Canek, now considered a legend in lucha libre. The UWA also helped popularize the match format that is now the most common in Mexico, the Best two out of three falls Six-man tag team match, or Trios match when they put together the rudo (bad guy) trio Los Misioneros de la Muerte (Negro Navarro, El Signo and El Texano) and matched them up against trios of popular tecnicos (good guys) and drew so many sell-crowds that other promotions began to heavily promote the Trios format as well.

Los Misionares de la Muerte were originally workhorse midcarders in the UWA, but their stock rose immediately in a UWA match on November 2, 1980 in a match where the three faced Huracan Ramirez, Black Shadow, and the legendary El Santo. Santo, 63 years old at the time, suffered a legitimate heart attack during the match, which ended in a no contest while he was rushed to the hospital. The three were then re-cast as fallen angels sent to Earth to take out Santo, and were programmed against trios of other tecnicos.

Championships
The Universal Wrestling Association promoted a large number of wrestling championships, spread out over several weight classes like Boxing and even co-promoted championships with the WWF, Universal Lucha Libre and JWP in Japan.  Some UWA titles are still being used today, some in Japanese promotions who bought the rights to the belts and the name to give them a lucha libre link, others are considered more "vanity" championships, owned by whoever holds them and are often used more as a storyline prop, although they are at times defended and even change hands. In some cases the UWA championship belts are bought and sold by the champions. At times both Consejo Mundial de Lucha Libre (previously known as EMLL) and AAA have acknowledged and promoted UWA championships as recent as 2008.

Shows

Former personnel

See also

List of professional wrestling promotions in Mexico

References

Lucha libre
Mexican professional wrestling promotions
Entertainment companies established in 1975
Entertainment companies disestablished in 1995
1975 establishments in Mexico
1995 disestablishments in Mexico